Clare Island Salmon is a variety of Atlantic salmon which  was granted Protected Geographical Indication status under European Union law in 1999. Clare Island is in County Mayo in Ireland.

See also
 Irish cuisine
 List of Irish food and drink products with protected status

References

Irish products with protected designation of origin
Irish cuisine